Ruth Karr McKee (March 28, 1874 – 1951) was for several years a member of the Board of Regents, University of Washington.

Early years and education
Ruth Karr was born in Hoquiam, Washington, on March 28, 1874, the daughter of James Karr and Abigail Boutwell Walker (b. 1840), and granddaughter of Presbyterian missionaries Mary Richardson (1811-1897) and Elkanah Walker (1805-1877). 

In 1895 she obtained a B. A. and an M. A. from University of Washington. She was part of the sororities Phi Beta Kappa, Pi Lambda Theta, Phi Sigma Gamma.

Career

She was President of the Washington State Federarion of Women's Clubs from 1913 to 1915. She was Director of the General Federation in 1916. She was Member of the State Council of Defense from 1917 to 1919. She was Member of Board of Regents of the University of Washington from 1917 to 1926, and president of Board in 1923. 

She was also member of: American Association of University Women, Round Robin Club, Longview Community Service Club, Mary Richardson Walker Chapter, Daughter of the American Revolution, American Academy of Political and Social Science, National Economic League. 

She married James S. McKee, Honolulu, on May 6, 1902, and lived at Longview, Washington.

She is the author of Mary Richardson Walker: Her Book (1945). The Walkers were one of six couples sent by the American Board of Commissioners for Foreign Missions to the Oregon Mission. The Walkers and the Eells established the mission at Tshimakain, near the present day town of Ford, Washington, to work with the Spokane Indians. The Walkers later moved to the Willamette Valley of Oregon.

She died in 1951.

The Ruth Karr McKee Papers 1941-1943 are hosted at the Manuscripts, Archives, and Special Collections division of the Washington State University Libraries.

References

1874 births
1951 deaths
American women educators
People from Longview, Washington